Masoud Salavati-Niasari is an Iranian Chemist specializing in nano-science and nano-technology in Iran

Salavati-Niasari is a professor at the Department of Chemistry of University of Kashan. He is an international scientist in materials engineering, chemical engineering, and chemistry.

See also
Science in Iran
Intellectual movements in Iran

References

Year of birth missing (living people)
Living people
Iranian chemists
21st-century Iranian inventors
Academic staff of the University of Kashan